Stage School Australia (formerly Children's Performing Company of Australia - CPCA) is a Melbourne-based performing arts training provider for young people.

Established in 1984 as the Victorian Children's Theatre. It notably encompasses the Young Australian Broadway Chorus and the Victorian Youth Theatre. Since its foundation, the organisation has expanded to twenty one locations across the greater Melbourne area to become one of the largest performing arts tuition providers in the state of Victoria.

Performing Arts Tuition
Stage School offers several streams of training which, depending on the age of the young people, can be conducted separately or concurrently.  Most streams have a hierarchical structure wherein students may be promoted to a more advanced group, based on the student's skill level and experience.

Young Australian Broadway Chorus
In 1995, the company established four theatre ensembles with a strong musical theatre focus. These expanded to become what is now known as the Young Australian Broadway Chorus (YABC), the stream which trains students in singing, dancing and acting.

The YABC's first performance was held in 1998 at the National Theatre in St Kilda - a gala performance much simpler than the more extravagant shows that are put on in the same theatre by YABC students today.

Victorian Youth Theatre
The Victorian Youth Theatre (VYT) is the drama branch of Stage School's performing arts training activities, which originally traded in the 1980s as the Victorian Children's Theatre. While trading as the Victorian Children's Theatre, the course focused largely on improvised drama, but eventually the curriculum was expanded to include script work and acting for the camera.

Performances
Stage School Australia also operates as a performing arts company and have been putting on multiple stage productions annually for two decades. Stage School Australia have done seasons of original plays and musicals as well as many theatre classics including; The Conference of the Birds, Godspell, Man of La Mancha, Joseph and the Amazing Technicolor Dreamcoat, Oliver!, Rags, Salad Days, Wizard of Oz, Spring Awakening, Seussical TYA, Conference of the Birds, Disney Alice in Wonderland Jr, Disney Aladdin Jr, BABE the Sheep-Pig, Disney The Little Mermaid Jr, The Secret Garden ~ Spring Version, Disney Beauty and the Beast Jr, Honk! Jr, Shrek Jr, Wicked, Madagascar - A Musical Adventure Jr.

Tours
Since 1996, Stage School Australia has conducted many tours in Australia and internationally. Stage School Australia have toured to countries including; France, Germany, Greece, Singapore, Italy, the United States and England.

YABC and VYT touring groups have performed in a variety of high-profile venues including Disneyland. Disneyworld, Disneyland Paris, Theatre Row, Universal Studios, Smithsonian Institution, Lincoln Center for the Performing Arts, York Theatre Royal, Soho Theatre Pegasus Theatre Oxford to name just a few.

Beginners OnStage
Stage School Australia has offered a performing arts program for children aged 5 to 7 since 2006. This program was officially launched under the name Beginners OnStage in late 2008. In 2017 the Foundation program was launched to cater for preschool aged children 4 & 5 years old.

Talent Company of Australia
The  Talent Company of Australia (TCA) was established in 2003 to provide students with entertainment industry representation. In addition to providing talent management services to students, the TCA provides skill-building workshops to members.

Australian Boys Dance Academy
Established in 2014, the Australian Boys Dance Academy offers boys-only dance classes in Jazz, Tap, HipHop and Classical for boys and young men aged 6 – 18 years.

Diploma of Musical Theatre
In 2019, Stage School ran a pilot performance based programme called First-Year Performance Intensive. In 2020, the company will launch a fully accredited Diploma of Musical Theatre CUA50213.

Notable Stage School alumni
Bernard Angel
Deniz Akdeniz
Alicia Attwood
Darcy Bonser
James Bryers
Samantha Dodemaide
Andrew Lees
Rhiannon Fish
James Frecheville
Claire George
Hannah Greenwood
Tessa James
Josie Lane
Adrian Li Donni
Reuben Liversidge
Luigi Lucente
Nikolai Nikolaeff
Emilio Ramos
Chris Scalzo
James Simpson
Michelle Smitheram
Caitlin Stasey
Samantha Tolj
Alex Tsitsopoulos
Matthew Werkmeister
Drew Weston

Sources

Performing arts education in Australia
Performing arts companies
Children's theatre